Biagio Brugi (1855 – 1934) was an Italian jurist. He taught Roman law at Catania (1882), Padua (1885) and Pisa (1918–30).  He was a student of Filippo Serafini.

His works underline the relevance of Roman law for contemporary jurisprudence. His influential 1891 textbook Introduzione enciclopedica alle scienze giuridiche e sociali nel sistema della giurisprudenza emphasised the importance of research in the political and social sciences for the study of law.

Brugi was a member of the Accademia dei Lincei, the Istituto Veneto and of several foreign academies, as well as government commissions. 1928 he was made a senator for life.

Works

References
 

1855 births
1934 deaths
19th-century Italian jurists
20th-century Italian jurists
Members of the Senate of the Kingdom of Italy
People from Orbetello